Anel Džaka (born 19 September 1980) is a German former professional footballer of Bosnian descent who played as a midfielder and current the coach of TuS Koblenz.

Career
Džaka began his career with Bayer 04 Leverkusen, where he made three Bundesliga appearances in three years as well as making it onto the bench for the 2002 UEFA Champions League Final. He left in 2003, joining VfL Osnabrück, where he spent just one season before joining TuS Koblenz. He was a popular figure at Koblenz, captaining the side and helping them earn promotion to the 2. Bundesliga in 2006. In 2008, he joined Koblenz's local rivals 1. FC Kaiserslautern. In February 2010, he returned on loan to TuS Koblenz. He was released by Kaiserslautern in June 2011, and spent half a season without a club before signing for Rot-Weiß Oberhausen. Six months later, after Oberhausen were relegated, he returned to TuS Koblenz for a third time.

References

External links
 
 Leverkusen Who's Who 

1980 births
Living people
Footballers from Sarajevo
German people of Bosnia and Herzegovina descent
German footballers
Germany under-21 international footballers
Association football midfielders
Bayer 04 Leverkusen players
Bayer 04 Leverkusen II players
VfL Osnabrück players
TuS Koblenz players
1. FC Kaiserslautern players
Rot-Weiß Oberhausen players
Bundesliga players
2. Bundesliga players
3. Liga players